Mamrux (also, Mamrukh) is a village and municipality in the Zaqatala Rayon of Azerbaijan.  It has a population of 2,150.  The municipality consists of the villages of Mamrux, Ələsgər, and Cimcimax.

References

External links

Populated places in Zaqatala District